Perdicella fulgurans is an extinct species of tropical tree-living, air-breathing, land snail, arboreal pulmonate gastropod mollusks in the family Achatinellidae.

This species was endemic to Hawaii in the United States.

References

F
Molluscs of Hawaii
Extinct gastropods
Extinct Hawaiian animals
Gastropods described in 1900
Taxonomy articles created by Polbot